Mohamed Mehdi Hasan (born 14 September 1971) is a Bangladeshi sprinter. He competed in the men's 400 metres at the 1992 Summer Olympics.

References

External links
 

1971 births
Living people
Athletes (track and field) at the 1992 Summer Olympics
Bangladeshi male sprinters
Olympic athletes of Bangladesh
Place of birth missing (living people)